Hibbertia priceana is a species of flowering plant in the family Dilleniaceae and is endemic to the south-west of Western Australia. It is a dwarf, usually compact shrub with erect, narrow elliptic leaves and bright yellow flowers with eleven stamens, nine in three groups of three, around three glabrous carpels.

Description
There are eleven stamens, in three groups of three and two free, arranged around three glabrous carpels that each contain a single ovule. Flowering occurs from June to August.

Taxonomy
Hibbertia priceana was first formally described in 2002 by Judith R. Wheeler in the journal Nuytsia from specimens she collected near Ongerup in 2001. The specific epithet (priceana) honours John Price, who brought the species to the author's attention.

Distribution and habitat
This hibbertia occurs in the Avon Wheatbelt, Esperance Plains and Mallee biogeographic regions, where it grows in mallee-heath on ridges.

Conservation status
Hibbertia priceana is classified as "Threatened Flora (Declared Rare Flora — Extant)" by the Government of Western Australia Department of Biodiversity, Conservation and Attractions.

See also
List of Hibbertia species

References

priceana
Flora of Western Australia
Plants described in 2002